Nannophya dalei is a species of dragonfly of the family Libellulidae, 
known as the eastern pygmyfly. 
It inhabits boggy seepages and swamps in south-eastern Australia.
It is a small dragonfly with black and red markings.

Gallery

See also
 List of Odonata species of Australia

References

Libellulidae
Odonata of Australia
Endemic fauna of Australia
Taxa named by Robert John Tillyard
Insects described in 1908